Perry Barr is a suburban area in north Birmingham, England. It is also the name of a council constituency, managed by its own district committee. Birmingham Perry Barr is also a parliamentary constituency; its Member of Parliament is Khalid Mahmood.

The constituency includes the smaller Perry Barr ward, and the wards of Handsworth Wood, Lozells and East Handsworth, and Oscott, which each elect three councillors to Birmingham City Council.

Etymology
There were four ancient manors in this area (all part of the parish of Handsworth) called Hamstead, Oscott, Perry, and Little (or Parva) Barr. Perry is the area around the parish church and this name is seen on maps but now seldom used. Over time, through confusion or convenience, the whole district came to be known as Perry Barr. "Perry" comes from the Old English "pirige", meaning "pear tree". The derivation of "Barr" is Old Celtic "barro" meaning "hill top". Barr Beacon, the area's highest hill, is in neighbouring Great Barr.

History

Perry Barr was originally two separate entities, both mentioned in the Domesday Book as 'Pirio' and 'Barre'. Pirio is recorded as having an estimated population of 35 and Barre with an estimated population of 25. William Fitz-Ansculf is recorded as being the tenant in chief of both manors, and Drogo as the tenant. It is thought that the two manors may have been combined in the Early Middle Ages.

In 1874, Perry Barr established its own institute based on the model of the Birmingham and Midland Institute.. In 1878, Henry Irving became the president of the Perry Barr Institute and addressed members of the institute on 6 March 1878. His speech was reprinted in the 13 March release of Theatre and also reprinted onto pamphlets by the institute's members and sold for sixpence to fund the construction of a new building for the institute. It was converted into a Carnegie-funded library in September 1897. In early 2007, this library, ultimately known as Birchfield Community Library, was demolished due to its dilapidated condition. Another library in the area is Tower Hill Library.

Aston Villa opened their Wellington Road ground in Perry Barr in 1876, playing there until 1897.

Perry Barr Urban District was an urban district in Staffordshire from 1894 until 1928, when it was largely incorporated into Birmingham and thus also Warwickshire (this included an area which is now considered part of Great Barr). It then became part of the West Midlands in 1974 when Birmingham became a metropolitan borough in the county.

In 1903, Birmingham Crematorium, the City's first, was opened by Sir Henry Thompson, president of the Cremation Society, in Perry Barr at 389 Walsall Road. It has been privately owned, currently by Dignity plc.

In the 1920s, Oscar Deutsch opened his first ever Odeon cinema here. The original cinema is now a conference venue, having also been a bingo hall. The 1920s Perry Barr Stadium on the Aldridge Road hosts greyhound racing and the Birmingham Brummies speedway team. It has a 500-seat capacity, and was refurbished in 2004. It is the former home of the Birchfield Harriers, whose Art Deco-styled bas relief badge it still carries. The Harriers now operate from nearby Alexander Stadium.

Aston Technical College (later renamed North Birmingham Technical College) moved to a new site in Perry Barr in the late 1960s, and was incorporated into the creation of Birmingham Polytechnic (now Birmingham City University) in 1971. Two of the college's buildings existed as part of the university's City North Campus, scheduled to close in 2018.

There is a mall-style shopping centre in the district known as "One Stop" Shopping Centre. This was built in the early 1990s, replacing a previous 1960s-era shopping centre. To facilitate the 1990s construction, a length of the River Tame was diverted and canalised. A Wetherspoons pub, the Arthur Robertson, opened later is named after Arthur Robertson, the Birchfield Harriers' first Olympic gold medallist (1908).

A memorial to PC Malcolm Walker, of the West Midlands Police, is situated outside shops on the city-bound side of Birchfield Road. He died on 4 October 2001, when his motorcycle was struck during a police pursuit.

The site of the former Perry Hall is now Perry Hall Park. Perry Park hosted the Birmingham Carnival in 2005.

Transport

Major roads in the ward and constituency include the M6 motorway and the A34. Bus routes operated by the National Express West Midlands Perry Barr bus garage in the area include Nos 11A, 11C, 33, 46, 51, 54, 68A, 68C, 907, 907A, 934, 937, 937A (evenings and Sundays), 952, 997, and 997E (towards Pheasey). The A4040 and A34 roads cross at Perry Barr, the former carrying the Birmingham Outer Circle bus routes. In addition the A453 towards Sutton Coldfield begins at Perry Barr.

Route X51 runs through Perry Barr, but does not stop in Perry Barr. The nearest stop on the route is Walsall Road, Alexander Stadium before running non-stop to Birmingham City Centre.

To the south-west of the ward is the Walsall line, part of the old Grand Junction Railway, which has two railway stations within the boundaries of the ward; Hamstead railway station and Perry Barr railway station. The latter, opened in 1837, is one of the oldest stations in the country to remain on its original site.

The Tame Valley Canal bisects the ward, with boats from Salford Junction, under Gravelly Hill Interchange climbing the 13-flight Perry Barr Locks towards Hamstead and on to Rushall Junction. There is a feeder reservoir, Perry Reservoir, in Perry Park.

The River Tame passes through the area and is crossed by several bridges, including Perry Bridge, a scheduled ancient monument of 1711, on the line of the Roman Ryknild Street and its 1932 Art Deco replacement carrying the Aldridge Road. The old bridge appears on the badge of nearby Handsworth Grammar School. A stream, the Holbrook, originating on the slopes of Barr Beacon, flows into the river just upstream from the bridge. The area around the bridge is known as Holford.

Sport

Aston Manor Cricket Club are situated in Perry Barr, as is the international athletics stadium Alexander Stadium. These are located on Church Road just by Perry Park. The Hub on Holford Drive is home to Continental Star F.C., as well as Continental Star Cricket, Continental Stars table tennis club, tennis clubs, and Aston Amateur Boxing Club.

Perry Barr Greyhound Stadium on the Aldridge Road plays host to two sports: greyhound racing, which is primarily run on Saturday nights with daytime meetings during the week, and speedway, the team racing there being the Birmingham Brummies, who run on a Wednesday night schedule from April to October. The Birmingham Brummies currently ride in the SGB Championship which is the second tier of British speedway.

Ward

The Perry Barr ward is part of the Birmingham, Perry Barr parliamentary constituency. Following boundary changes in 2004, the eastern edge of the ward follows the M6 motorway from Spaghetti Junction to junction 7 at Great Barr, including parts of the communities of Witton, Aston, Perry Barr and Great Barr.

Since 2004, the three councillors representing Perry Barr on Birmingham City Council have been Ray Hassall, Karen Hamilton and Jon Hunt, all of them Liberal Democrats. Hassall was elected in 1990, Hunt in 2003 and Hamilton in 2004. Hamilton became the first black councillor elected for the ward. In a 2017 by-election, Morriam Jan, elected as a Liberal Democrat, became the first councillor of South Asian origin elected for the ward.

Prior to 1990, the ward had a strong tendency towards the Conservative Party. No single party held all the seats in the ward between 1990 and 2004. The Liberal Democrats took a clean sweep at the 2004 Council Elections in which all seats were contested, but only after three recounts. In 2006, Hamilton increased her personal majority from 31 to more than 1,500, and the party went on to win every election in the ward until boundary changes in 2018.

The ward had Labour representation for a period, from 1995 till 2004 following the election of Mike Leddy (1995–2003), along with the defection of Ron Whitehouse from the Liberal Democrats to the Labour Party (2000–2004).

For the 2018 and any subsequent elections the ward was reduced in size to two councillors and parts of the former Aston ward, included in 2004, were returned to a new Aston ward. The new Perry Barr ward includes Witton Cemetery and the Moor Lane Sports Ground.

Election winners

1986 – Conservative
1987 – Conservative
1988 – Conservative
1990 – Liberal Democrat
1991 – Liberal Democrat
1992 – Conservative
1994 – Liberal Democrat
1995 – Labour
1996 – Liberal Democrat
1998 – Liberal Democrat
1999 – Labour
2000 – Liberal Democrat (defected to Labour within 12 months)
2002 – Liberal Democrat
2003 – Liberal Democrat
2004 – 3 x Liberal Democrat (following boundary changes)
2006 – Liberal Democrat - Karen Hamilton
2007 – Liberal Democrat - Jon Hunt
2008 – Liberal Democrat - Ray Hassall
2010 – Liberal Democrat - Karen Hamilton
2011 – Liberal Democrat - Jon Hunt
2012 – Liberal Democrat - Ray Hassall
2014 – Liberal Democrat - Karen Trench (previously Hamilton)
2015 – Liberal Democrat - Jon Hunt
2016 - Liberal Democrat - Ray Hassall (deceased March 2017)
2017 (by-election) – Liberal Democrat - Morriam Jan
2018 - 2 x Liberal Democrat (following boundary changes) - Jon Hunt & Morriam Jan

Demographics and notable residents
The 2001 Population Census recorded that 22,704 people were living in Perry Barr. 28.2% (6,410) of the ward's population was represented by ethnic minorities, compared with 29.6% for Birmingham in general.

British musician Steve Winwood was a choirboy at St John's Church of England parish church in Perry Barr.

See also
Jami Masjid and Islamic Centre Birmingham
Perry Barr Reservoir
Perry Hall, Maryland

References

External links

 Birmingham City Council: Perry Barr Constituency
 Birmingham City Council: Perry Barr Ward
 Perry Barr Community Network
 Birchfield Library
 

 
Areas of Birmingham, West Midlands
Wards of Birmingham, West Midlands